Pisaj or Evil (literally Human, Ghost, Demon) is a 2004 Thai horror film written and directed by Chookiat Sakveerakul.

Plot

After her parents are killed in a drive-by shooting, a young woman named Oui has no place else to go. She shows up at a printing house run by her Aunt Bua and is given the task of caring for her aunt's grandson, a young boy named Arm, a kid who sees ghosts.

Oui suffers from hallucinations, brought on by the trauma of seeing her parents killed, and is taking medications. And Aunt Bua is involved in some sort of mysticism, and keeps a strange shrine in the house.

With the drug war by prime minister Thaksin Shinawatra as a subtext, many threads in this strange ghost story are somehow tied together.

Cast
Pumwaree Yodkamol as Oui 
Alexander Rendell as Arm
Amora Purananda as Aunt Bua 
Dreranai Suwanhom as Mai
Jarunee Boonsake as Noi
Wassana Onmak as Sudjai
Prinn Vadhanavira as Mystery Man

See also
List of ghost films
Pishacha

References

External links

2004 films
Thai ghost films
Sahamongkol Film International films
Thai horror films
Films directed by Chookiat Sakveerakul